Matthew Hindley (born 1974, Cape Town, South Africa) is a South African painter. He graduated from the Michaelis School of Fine Art, Cape Town in 2002, where he was awarded the Michaelis Prize.

As one of the country's most recognized younger painters, Hindley’s intense, poetic and delving artworks have featured in various critical and seminal South African exhibitions. Recent solo presentations have included An Everlasting Once at Brundyn + Gonsalves, Cape Town (2011) and Twilight of the Idols at Biksady, Budapest (2013).  Hindley’s exhibition of drawings at David Krut Cape Town coincided with the official launch of the book, The Five Magic Pebbles & other stories. His notable solo painting presentation Resurrection (Der Brennende Wald) was held at Everard Read Cape Town gallery, in October 2015.

In addition, he has presented at the world renowned Eli and Edythe Broad Museum, Michigan (2012) and the Kochi Muziris Biennale, India (2012). In 2014 he worked on a series of paintings inspired by the mythological African tales of South African writer Don Mattera, for a book published by Rhodeworks, in Berlin, Germany. In 2015 his artwork was part of the imago mundi, Benetton Collection at the Venice Biennale, and his major public sculpture Speak Naturally and Continuously was installed above the entrance of the South African National Gallery in Cape Town, South Africa. This artwork was rebuilt in late 2018/ early 2019 and reopened to the general public interaction May 2019.

Education

2002 – Bachelor of Fine Arts, University of Cape Town, Cape Town, South Africa

Images

Selected solo exhibitions

2019
The Brush Itself Incites, Vault Gallery, Silo Hotel, Cape Town, South Africa

2018       
The Divided Self, Everard Read, Cape Town, South Africa

2018
Survey of Risk, David Krut, Johannesburg, South Africa

2015
Resurrection (Der Brennende Wald), Everard Read, Cape Town, South Africa

2013
Twilight of the Idols, Biksady Galeria, Budapest, Hungary

2012
Volta 8, Basel, Switzerland, BRUNDYN + GONSALVES, Cape Town

2011
The Solo Project, Basel, Switzerland /
An Everlasting once, BRUNDYN + GONSALVES (Formerly iArt Gallery), Cape Town, South Africa

2007
Private Vernissage, Berlin, Germany, with Kromschroeder & Pfannenschmidt

2006
Before My Time, 34LONG, Cape Town

2005
Speak Naturally & Continuously, Iziko South African National Gallery, Cape Town /
Absolute Chop, ( Art-Directed by Zwelethu Mthethwa ), Mzoli’s Butchery and Grill, Gugulethu

2004
Untitled, Klein Karoo National Arts Festival, Oudtshoorn /
Surrender, Bell-Roberts Gallery, Cape Town

2003
Infra-Red, The Michaelis Gallery, Cape Town, South Africa
Angostura Dam (U.S.)

References

External links
 Artbio, an overview of Hindley's work by Andrew Lamprecht
 Matthew Hindley: Artist on the Cusp, an interview
 Matthew Hindley at the Cold Room, a review
 Matthew Hindley in The Strip Gallery
 Full Artist CV

Living people
South African painters
South African male painters
Michaelis School of Fine Art alumni
Academic staff of the University of Cape Town
1974 births